Mohamed Walid Tiboutine (born 28 February 1991) is an Algerian footballer.

Career
In 2019, Tiboutine signed a two-year contract with USM Alger.

In 2020, He signed a two-year contract with USM Bel Abbès.

References 

Living people
1991 births
Algerian footballers
Association football defenders
USM Alger players
JS Saoura players
USMM Hadjout players
USM Annaba players
21st-century Algerian people